SMK Bandar Baru UDA or Sekolah Menengah Kebangsaan Bandar Baru UDA is the main secondary school in Bandar Baru UDA, Johor Bahru, Johor, Malaysia. The school is located near Masjid Jamek Bandar Baru UDA. This school is the one of the most excellent and prestigious school in Malaysia.

1994 establishments in Malaysia
Buildings and structures in Johor Bahru
Educational institutions established in 1994
Secondary schools in Malaysia
Schools in Johor